Rafael Corrales Ayala Espinoza (14 September 1925 – 27 January 2015) was a Mexican lawyer and politician from the Institutional Revolutionary Party who served as Governor of Guanajuato from 1985 to 1991. He previously served as member of the Chamber of Deputies during the XLI and LI Legislatures of the Mexican Congress for Guanajuato's 1st District. He was the President of the Chamber of Deputies in 1956. He died on 27 January 2015

References

1925 births
2015 deaths
Governors of Guanajuato
Presidents of the Chamber of Deputies (Mexico)
Members of the Chamber of Deputies (Mexico)
Politicians from Guanajuato
People from Guanajuato City
20th-century Mexican lawyers
Institutional Revolutionary Party politicians
20th-century Mexican politicians